Armak (also Romanized as Armāk) is a village in Gatab-e Shomali Rural District, Gatab District, Babol County, Mazandaran Province, Iran. At the 2006 census, its population was 1,072, in 259 families.

References 

Populated places in Babol County